Secret Agent is the title of the eleventh studio album by the British singer-songwriter Judie Tzuke, released in 1998.

Track listing
 "Tonight" (Judie Tzuke, Mike Paxman) – 5:16
 "Swallowing" (Tzuke, David P. Goodes) – 4:29
 "Both Alone" (Tzuke, Richard Cardwell) – 3:56
 "That's Where My Heart Used to Be" (Tzuke, Peter Gordeno) – 4:34
 "The Girl I Want to Be" (Tzuke, Cardwell) – 4:52
 "Secret Agent" (Tzuke, Bob Noble) – 4:16
 "Little Cloud" (Tzuke, Goodes) – 5:20
 "Dancing on Charcoal" (Tzuke, Goodes) – 4:15
 "Fuel Injection" (Tzuke, Cardwell) – 4:19
 "Bully" (Tzuke, Goodes) – 5:51
 "Move On" (Tzuke, Gordeno) – 4:38
 "Mother" (Tzuke, Cardwell) – 5:12

Personnel
Judie Tzuke – lead and backing vocals, rhythm programming on track 7
David P. Goodes – electric and acoustic guitars, mandolin, synthesizer on track 1, rhythm programming, producer on tracks 1, 2, 7, 8 and 10
Richard Cardwell – keyboards, piano on track 6 and 12, strings arrangements, producer on tracks 3, 5, 9 and 12
Peter Gordeno – keyboards on tracks 1, 2, 4, 7, 10 and 11, bass on tracks 2 and 8, piano on track 9, backing vocals on track 4, producer on tracks 4 and 11
Bob Noble – synthesizer on track 6
Pino Palladino – bass
Paul Beavis – drums
Andy Newmark – drums on tracks 6 and 7
Gordon Mills – drums on track 10
Danny Cummings – percussion, cabassa on track 4, djembe, talking drum and rattle wishbone on track 8, cymbals on track 12
Cathy Morgan, Rachel Roberts, Helen Hathorn, Caroline Dale – strings on tracks 6 and 12
John Savannah – angelphone solo on track 8
Peter Cox, Lucie Silverman, Bailey Tzuke, Paul Muggleton, Jamie Muggleton, Kristy Hawkshaw – backing vocals
Peter Davis – strings arrangements

Production
Paul Muggleton – producer on all tracks, engineer
Mark Evans – engineer, mixing, rhythm programming
Oskar Pall – mastering

References
Official website

Judie Tzuke albums
1998 albums